The Wheel  is an American television game show hosted by Michael McIntyre that premiered on NBC on December 19, 2022. It is an adaptation of the British television series of the same name. Three contestants compete on each episode for a chance to win up to $180,000, drawing on the expertise of six celebrities in a variety of subjects.

Gameplay

Main game 
Six celebrities, each designated as an expert in a different subject, sit in chairs mounted on the outer edge of a large wheel on the main stage. They face in toward the center, below which three contestants sit in chairs on a smaller wheel. This wheel is spun to choose a contestant at random, who is lifted to the main stage.

In each round, the contestant chooses a subject, whose expert's seat lights up in gold, and also an expert to "shut down" – the one they believe is least likely to know about the subject, whose seat lights up red. The wheel is then spun to choose an expert randomly; if it does not stop on the "shut-down" one, the host asks a question with four multiple-choice answers. The contestant may discuss it with the expert before locking in an answer; a correct response adds $10,000 to the bank if the subject expert was spun, or $5,000 otherwise. If the contestant misses a question or spins a "shut down" expert, their turn ends and they are lowered back down to the smaller wheel, which is spun to choose a new contestant. Since the selection is random and all three contestants are always eligible to be chosen, the same contestant can return to the game immediately after being dismissed. Each subject remains in play until a contestant correctly answers a question in it.

The other five experts also answer the question, using keypads to lock in their answers. If an expert misses a question in their subject, whether or not they were spun for it, they are automatically shut down for the next round in addition to the expert chosen by the contestant. If all six experts answer correctly (a "Perfect Wheel"), a bonus of $5,000 is added to the bank. After all six subjects have been completed, the current contestant moves on to the final and has the first chance to win the money.

Final: Cashout 
The experts are ranked by how many questions they have answered correctly during the game. The contestant may choose the best, third-best, or worst performer to assist them; these choices respectively set the prize at 50%, 100%, or 200% of the banked total.

The wheel is spun to choose one of three new subjects, after which the host asks a question. The contestant may discuss it with the chosen expert for 30 seconds before locking in their final answer. A correct answer awards the money at stake to the contestant and ends the game. If the contestant misses, they are returned to the smaller wheel and a new contestant is chosen. The subject of the missed question, the expert chosen for it, and the prize associated with them are all removed from play. If the contestants miss questions with all three experts, they leave with nothing.

The maximum potential winnings total is $180,000, achievable by correctly answering a question in all six subjects with the help of the respective experts, achieving a "Perfect Wheel" in every round, and giving a correct answer in the final with the worst performer.

Production 
In February 2021, it was announced that NBC had made a 10-episode order for an American adaptation of The Wheel. In May 2021, it was announced that the show would premiere in the 2021–22 television season. In August 2021, it was announced that the show would premiere in 2022, with Michael McIntyre as host. However, in May 2022, it was reported that the show might premiere in 2023, either midseason or summer.

In November 2022, it was announced that the show would premiere on December 19, 2022, with its ten episodes airing across two weeks, during the holiday season.

Episodes

Reception

References

External links 
 
 

2020s American game shows
2022 American television series debuts
American television series based on British television series
English-language television shows
NBC original programming
Television series by Hungry Bear Media
Television series by Warner Horizon Television